Gouise is a commune in the Allier department in central France.

This small village is situated at the crossing of two secondary departmental roads, the D102 (East-West from Saint-Voir to Bessay-sur-Allier) and the D105 (North-South from Neuilly-le-Réal to Saint-Gérand-de-Vaux). Oddly, it has no church but a small town hall with an adjacent meeting room.

Population

Economy
Gouise lives mainly on farming (cattle) and tourism (bed and breakfast). There is also a construction work company. Other people live there but go to work in town (Moulins) or in neighbouring villages.

See also
Communes of the Allier department

References

Communes of Allier
Allier communes articles needing translation from French Wikipedia